Dhi Qahm is a sub-district located in Ba'dan District, Ibb Governorate, Yemen. Dhi Qahm had a population of 2273 as of 2004.

References 

Sub-districts in Ba'dan District